In Hinduism, Asvayujau is a goddess of fortune, good luck, joy and happiness.

References 

Hindu goddesses
Fortune goddesses